Polar Music is a Swedish record company founded in 1963 by Stig Anderson and his friend Bengt Bernhag.

Background
The first act that Polar Music signed was the Hootenanny Singers featuring Björn Ulvaeus. Polar eventually gained prosperity producing Ulvaeus' next group, international superstars ABBA. As a small Scandinavian company based in Sweden, Polar could not afford to set up operations worldwide and was ABBA's record company only in the Scandinavian countries. Therefore, ABBA's recordings were licensed to different record companies in each country, but usually to companies that had international operations, meaning they could effectively compete with each other to acquire the licenses in more countries if they proved successful in their own. The licenses gave the companies a few allowances to issue certain tracks as singles that Polar had not, or to modify single (and occasionally album) artwork. The licenses were for three years at a time, meaning that between 1989 and 1992 they all expired. This enabled PolyGram to release Gold: Greatest Hits to major success around the world.

Polar Music is currently distributed by Universal Music Group whose predecessor company, PolyGram, purchased it in 1989.  However, Polar Music International AB legally still exists and ABBA's recordings remain copyrighted to the company.  Polar is now ABBA's record label internationally, and the historic Polar vinyl label designs have been used on the group's CD releases since 2004 (usually on deluxe releases of studio albums).

The Polar Music Prize, an award for outstanding musical achievement, was created by Stig Anderson, the same year after he sold the label to PolyGram.

Polar Music artists
Artists signed by Polar Music included ABBA, Alive Feat, Jessie Martins, Lena Andersson, Chana, Crosstalk, Dilba, Emilia, Anni-Frid Lyngstad, Agnetha Fältskog and Linda Ulvaeus, Ted Gärdestad, Gemini, The Hellacopters, The Infinite Mass, Fredrik Kempe, Lambretta, Maarja, Paulo Mendonça, Mr. Vegas Fea Intense, Emma Nilsdotter, Mats Paulson, Pineforest Crunch, Sam (musician), Skintrade, Starr Chukki/infinit, Svenne and Lotta, Joey Tempest, Top-Notch, Harpo, Topaz Sound and Anders Widmark. The last band to be signed to Polar were Beagle whose two albums for the label Sound On Sound and Within are considered to be power-pop classics.

See also
 List of record labels
 Polar Studios, a recording studio founded by Stig Anderson, Björn Ulvaeus, and Benny Andersson

References

Swedish record labels
Record labels established in 1963
Pop record labels
Labels distributed by Universal Music Group
Polar Music albums
ABBA